The Anglican Church of All Saints in Kingweston, Somerset, England was rebuilt between 1852 and 1855 by Charles Edmund Giles. It is a Grade II* listed building.

History

A small amount of the fabric of the medieval church on the site, including the doorway, remains but it was largely rebuilt by Charles Edmund Giles between 1852 and 1855. The rebuilding was funded by Francis Dickinson the local member of parliament.

The structure of the church was damaged when bombs exploded nearby during World War II.

The parish is part of the Wheathill Priory Group of Parishes benefice within the Diocese of Bath and Wells.

Architecture

The stone building has Doulting stone dressings and stone slate roofs. It consists of a three-bay nave and two-bay chancel. The single storey tower, which is supported by buttresses, has an octagonal spire.

The interior is all from the 19th century but it does have a 12th-century font.

See also  
 List of ecclesiastical parishes in the Diocese of Bath and Wells

References

Grade II* listed buildings in South Somerset
Grade II* listed churches in Somerset
Church of England church buildings in South Somerset